Brand New Unit, commonly known as BNU, was a Canadian Hardcore punk band from suburban Vancouver, British Columbia. Its members were Gary Lavallee (vocals), Jinx Stringer (guitar), Ben Hughes (bass), and Garnet Kulhavy (drums). Kulhavy would later be replaced by Gob drummer Gabe Mantle.

History
The band formed in 1991 in Surrey, B.C. and started out playing locally and in Vancouver. 

In 1992 they were winners of CITR-FM's 1982 SHiNDiG live performance contest, which awarded them some studio time. They used it to record their first EP, Summertime. Influences of 7 Seconds and Dag Nasty can be heard on Summertime with Kulhavy, while later recordings feature a more post-hardcore feel with hard-hitting live elements.

In 1993, they were included on Crank It Up - Volume 11, part of Thrasher Magazines Skate Rock series. In 1994, they released their first album, Under The Big Top.

Brand New Unit toured constantly and expanded their following into the US market. In 1995, they released three EPs and, by 1997, had enough material to release a compilation album, Looking Back Again."Brand New Unit Diddley Squat Creative Man Looking Back Again BYO". Ink19, February 9, 1998. Ryan Eckhart

In 1998 the band released the album Diddly Squat through the Creative Man label."New Releases : Dishwalla's followup album rates A-, offering songs that get lots of airplay". Los Angeles Times, July 30, 1998|Bill Locey  In 1999, they released a split EP with Kill Sadie, and were included in a VML Records compilation album with The Pist, Supernova and The Gain. They released one more EP in 1999 and broke up in 2000.

In February, 2010, Brand New Unit played a reunion show in Vancouver. They continued to play occasionally, last appearing in Victoria in 2018.

In October 2021, Gary Lavallee passed away; his cause of death was not released. In November 2021, Garnet Kulhavy died of COVID-19.

 Discography Albums Under The Big Top (1994), Excursion Records 
 Looking Back Again (1997), BYO Records
 Diddley Squat (1998), Creative Man DiscEPs'''
 Summertime 7" (1992), 3 Minute Mile Records  
 All For Nothing 7" (1995), HeartFirst Records
 Quickdraw Richy Rich (1995), HeartFirst Records
 No Heroes (1995), HeartFirst Records
 Kill Sadie + Brand New Unit Split 7" (1999), Modern Radio Record Label
 Empty Useless Air'' (1999), Burning Heart Records

References 

Musical groups established in 1991
Musical groups disestablished in 2000
Musical groups from Vancouver
Canadian hardcore punk groups
Straight edge groups
BYO Records artists
1991 establishments in British Columbia
2000 disestablishments in British Columbia